HMS Jersey was a 40-gun fourth rate frigate of the English Navy, originally built for the navy of the Commonwealth of England at Maldon, and launched in 1654. By 1677 her armament had been increased to 48 guns.

In 1669, the diarist Samuel Pepys, while a member of the Navy Board, was temporarily named captain of Jersey as a legal maneuver to make him eligible to sit on a court-martial.

in March 1689 Jersey, together with the merchantman Deliverance brought stores to the city of Derry, which allowed it to sustain the Siege of Derry. The expedition was commanded by Captain James Hamilton, later the 6th Earl of Abercorn. The Jersey was commanded by Captain John Beverley RN.

Jersey was captured by the French in 1691.

Notes

References

 
 Lavery, Brian (2003) The Ship of the Line - Volume 1: The development of the battlefleet 1650-1850. Conway Maritime Press. .

Ships of the line of the Royal Navy
Ships built in Essex
1650s ships
Captured ships